Linda Grace Hoyer Updike (1904-1989) was an American writer from Plowville, Pennsylvania. She was the mother of author John Updike and grandmother of writer David Updike. Linda Updike also served as the model for several of her son's characters, including one of the main characters in the novel Of the Farm.

Early life and education
Linda Grace Hoyer (Updike) was born in 1904 on an 83-acre farm in Plowville, Pennsylvania as the only child of John Hoyer (1863-1953) and Katherine Kramer Hoyer (1873-1955), who were of mainly German ancestry, and the family attended Grace Evangelical Lutheran Church. Her parents sold their farm in 1921 and moved a large house in the nearby town of Shillington, Pennsylvania. Updike graduated from Keystone Normal School (Kutztown University), and then in 1923 at age nineteen she graduated from Ursinus College where she played field hockey. She then received a M.A. in English literature from Cornell University in New York in 1924 where she wrote a thesis on Sir Walter Scott's The Bride of Lammermoor.

Marriage and birth of John Updike
Updike married her Ursinus classmate, Wesley Russell Updike (1900-1972), in 1925 and their only child, John, was born in 1932. Wesley Updike worked as a cable tester for AT&T until being laid off during the Great Depression and then he became a math teacher in Shillington, and when John was eighteen months old Linda Updike began working at Pomeroy's Department store in the drapery department, while trying unsuccessfully to publish fiction in various publications for many years, which made an impression on her son. The Updikes lived with her parents in Shillington while John was young. During World War II Updike worked at a parachute factory and saved enough money to buy back her family farm and move the family to Plowville in 1945 much to the chagrin of her son.

Later writer career, death and legacy
Updike eventually published her first of ten pieces in The New Yorker in 1961, and in 1971 her novel, Enchantment was published. Her large manuscript of a historical fiction novel about Ponce De Leon remains unpublished as of 2022, despite being her magnum opus, which she worked on for many years. Updike died at her farm in Plowville in 1989 and was buried at Robeson Lutheran Church Cemetery. In 1990 Updike's semi-autobiographical collection of stories, entitled  The Predator, was published posthumously with illustrations by her granddaughter Elizabeth Updike Cobblah. Many of her papers are held at Ursinus College where they were donated by her son.

References

Novelists from Pennsylvania
Ursinus College alumni
Cornell University alumni
Kutztown University of Pennsylvania alumni
1904 births
1989 deaths